BD20 could refer to:

BD20, a postcode district in the BD postcode area
Biodiesel